Georgy Konstantinovich Mosolov (3 May 1926, in Ufa, Bashkortostan, Soviet Union – 18 March 2018) was a Soviet Russian test pilot. He attained the rank of Polkovnik (Colonel). He attained two world air speed records, in either the Mikoyan MiG-21 or the prototype Mikoyan Ye-66, as well as one altitude record. Colonel Mosolov was awarded the Hero of the Soviet Union and the Lenin Prize.

Colonel Mosolov also piloted the prototype MiG-21 on its first flight on 14 February 1955.

Notes

Sources
 Belyakov, R.A. and J. Marmain. MiG: Fifty Years of Secret Aircraft Design. Shrewsbury, UK:Airlife, 1994. .
 Hirvonen, Pauli: MMM - Nuorten Ilmailukirja, Otava, Helsinki, 1961 (s. 132)
 Highland, H.J.: Hauska on tietää 4 - Lentotaito, WSOY, 1974, suom. T.J. Kivilahti (alkuteos Wonder Books, Englanti 1961–66, suom. teos painettu Puolassa) 
 Lahtela & Nykänen (toim.): MiG-21 Suomen sinessä, Karjalan Lennoston Kilta ry./Kevama Graf, 1998, Kuopio  (s.24)

1926 births
2018 deaths
Heroes of the Soviet Union
Soviet test pilots
Soviet Air Force officers
Recipients of the Order of Lenin
Military personnel from Ufa
Russian aviation record holders
Soviet aviation record holders